Mečenčani is a village in the Donji Kukuruzari municipality, Central Croatia.

Geography
The village is located in the region of Banovina (known as Banija).

History

In 1905, the municipality of Mečenčani existed in the Zagreb County of Kingdom of Croatia-Slavonia, having 5025 people, of whom Serbs of the Orthodox faith numbered 4574 (91.1%).

It was previously part of the Kostajnica municipality. Before the outbreak of the Croatian War, the SAO Krajina (1990-1991) was self-proclaimed in the region by ethnic Serbs of Croatia. The region was subsequently reintegrated into Croatia after Operation Storm.

After the 2020 Petrinja earthquake, more than 50 large sinkholes appeared in the Mečenčani area, endangering the population.

Demographics

Religion

Serbian Orthodox Church of the Intercession of the Theotokos
Neoclassicist Serbian Orthodox Church of the Intercession of the Theotokos in Mečenčani was completed in 1877. Its icons were originally made for the Serbian Orthodox Church of the Dormition of the Theotokos in Donji Kukuruzari.

References

Савезни завод за статистику и евиденцију ФНРЈ и СФРЈ, попис становништва 1948, 1953, 1961, 1971, 1981. и 1991. године.

Populated places in Sisak-Moslavina County
Serb communities in Croatia